T2F, also known as The Second Floor, is a community space and the first project of the non-profit organization Peace Niche founded by Sabeen Mahmud. It is a café based in Karachi (Pakistan) and a vibrant center of the city's society. The place is designed to enable discussion on human rights, peace-building, justice, environment, social development and intellectual poverty alleviation.

Founded in 2007 the café was designed in the coffeehouse tradition. It consists of an art gallery, a bookshop, a coffeehouse and a conversation space. Exhibitions, conferences, talks, music concerts and festivals take place at T2F.

Awards 
 2016 Prince Claus Award

References

External links 
 Website of T2F

Organisations based in Karachi
Coffeehouses and cafés in Pakistan
Culture of Karachi
Restaurants in Lahore